Bradford, also known as Dixiana, is an unincorporated community in Jefferson County, Alabama, United States.

History
Bradford was originally named in honor of the English city Bradford by Jim Justice, who was a foreman of the local mines. The post office was then named Dixiana after it was found there was already a post office in Alabama operating under the name "Bradford."

Multiple different companies mined coal at mines in Bradford, including The Alabama By-Products Corporation, the Birmingham Furnace and Manufacturing Company, and Imperial Coal and Coke Company.

A post office operated under the name Dixiana from 1880 to 1984.

References

Unincorporated communities in Jefferson County, Alabama
Unincorporated communities in Alabama